Awwad Mohammad Al-Sharafat (born 25 December 1993) is a Jordanian middle-distance runner. He competed in the 1500 metres at the 2015 World Championships in Beijing without advancing from the first round.

His personal best in the 1500 metres is 3:57.71 set in Gwangju in 2015.

Competition record

References

Jordanian male middle-distance runners
Living people
Place of birth missing (living people)
1993 births
World Athletics Championships athletes for Jordan
Competitors at the 2015 Summer Universiade